is a passenger railway station located in the city of Tsuyama, Okayama Prefecture, Japan, operated by West Japan Railway Company (JR West).

Lines

Station layout
The station consists of one ground-level side platform serving a single bi-directional track. The station is unattended.

Adjacent stations

History
Sarayama Station opened as a provisional station on June 15, 1937. It was upgraded a full passenger station on June 1, 1944. With the privatization of the Japan National Railways (JNR) on April 1, 1987, the station came under the aegis of the West Japan Railway Company. A new glassed-in station building and waiting room was completed in March 2019.

Passenger statistics
In fiscal 2019, the station was used by an average of 18 passengers daily..

Surrounding area
 Japan National Route 53.

See also
List of railway stations in Japan

References

External links

  Sarayama Station Official Site

Railway stations in Okayama Prefecture
Tsuyama Line
Railway stations in Japan opened in 1937
Tsuyama